Robert Barton (1881–1975) was an Irish lawyer.

Robert Barton may also refer to:

Robert S. Barton (1925–2009), American computer systems architect and designer
Robert Barton (British Army officer) (1770–1853)
Robert Barton (RAF officer) (1916–2010), Canadian flying ace of WWII
Robert Barton of Over Barnton (died 1540), Scottish sailor and Lord High Treasurer
Robert T. Barton (1842–1917), American lawyer, politician and writer
Robert Barton (actor) (born 1970), British actor